Ichinohe may refer to:

Ichinohe, Iwate, Japanese municipality
Ichinohe Station, Japanese railroad station 
5532 Ichinohe, main-belt asteroid
Iwate-Ichinohe Tunnel, Japanese railroad-tunnel

People with the surname
Ichinohe Hyoe, Japanese World War II veteran
, Japanese speed skater
Tsuyoshi Ichinohe, Japanese ski jumper 

Japanese-language surnames